Palmeira d'Oeste is a municipality in the state of São Paulo, Brazil. The city has a population of 9,227 inhabitants and an area of 319.2 km².

Palmeira d'Oeste belongs to the Mesoregion of São José do Rio Preto.

References

Municipalities in São Paulo (state)